Kawarago Dam  is an earthfill dam located in Miyagi Prefecture in Japan. The dam is used for irrigation. The catchment area of the dam is 11 km2. The dam impounds about 30  ha of land when full and can store 2333 thousand cubic meters of water. The construction of the dam was completed in 1969.

See also
List of dams in Japan

References

Dams in Miyagi Prefecture